George di Madeiros Loy (November 27, 1840 – December 14, 1936) was a farmer and political figure in Quebec. He represented Beauharnois in the House of Commons of Canada from 1900 to 1904 as a Liberal.

He was born in Coteau-Landing, Lower Canada, the son of a Portuguese father and American mother. Loy was educated in Coteau-Landing and Ogdensburg, New York. In 1868, he married Elizabeth Wilson. He was mayor of Valleyfield from 1894 to 1899. His election in 1900 was declared void in 1902 but Loy won the subsequent by-election. He was defeated when he ran for reelection in 1904.

Loy also operated a paper mill in Valleyfield owned by Alexander Buntin.

|-
  
|Liberal
|George di Madeiros Loy
|align="right"|1,822    
  
|Conservative
|Joseph-Gédéon-Horace Bergeron  
|align="right"|1,663

References

External links

Members of the House of Commons of Canada from Quebec
Liberal Party of Canada MPs
Mayors of places in Quebec
1840 births
1936 deaths